The A173 is a major road in North Yorkshire, England. It runs from Stokesley to Skelton.

References 

Roads in Yorkshire
Transport in North Yorkshire